A tarang wa or square wa, sometimes transliterated as 'waa' or 'wah' is a unit of area used in Thailand for measuring land or property.  It is defined as the area of a square whose sides measure exactly one wa (two metres), equivalent to four square metres. Although its current size is precisely derived from the metre, it is neither part of nor recognized by the modern metric system, the International System (SI).

The square wa equals 1/100 ngaan or 1/400 rai, two units of area frequently used in Thailand. It also equals 1/25 are, another metre-derived unit of area not officially part of the SI.

As with many terms normally written with the Thai alphabet, there are many variant transliterations into English, e.g. dta-raang waa and tarang wah.

See also 
 Thai units of measurement
 Orders of magnitude (area) for a comparison with other areas

References

External links
 Area metric conversion, British and U.S., Japanese, Chinese, Thai, old French, others.

Geography of Thailand
Units of area
Thai units of measurement